Robert Smith (7 December 1858 – 18 March 1942) was a Canadian lawyer, politician and puisne justice of the Supreme Court of Canada.

Born in Lanark County, Canada West (now Ontario), the son of William Smith and Jean Neilson, he was educated in Almonte and at Osgoode Hall. He was called to the Ontario Bar in 1885. He then practiced law in Cornwall, Ontario.

In 1888, Smith married Florence Parker Pettit.

In 1904, he ran for the House of Commons of Canada as a Liberal in the riding of Stormont, Ontario. He lost but won in 1908. He did not run for re-election.

In 1908, Smith was named King's Counsel. Smith was a director and secretary-treasurer for the Montreal and Cornwall Navigation Company. He served as lieutenant-colonel in the militia.

In 1922, he was appointed to the High Court Division of the Supreme Court of Ontario and then to the Appellate Division. In 1926, he sat on the Supreme Court as an ad hoc judge and was appointed as a judge in 1927. He retired in 1933.

For reasons unknown, the federal government took over a year to appoint a replacement for Justice Smith, eventually appointing Henry Hague Davis in 1935.

Smith died in Ottawa at the age of 83.

References

External links
 Supreme Court of Canada biography

Justices of the Supreme Court of Canada
Liberal Party of Canada MPs
Members of the House of Commons of Canada from Ontario
1858 births
1942 deaths
Canadian King's Counsel
People from Lanark County